Brightwater is a community in Benton County, Arkansas, United States. It is the location of (or is the nearest community to) Springfield to the Fayetteville Road-Brightwater Segment, which is located at N Old Wire Road/Benton Cty Rd. 67, south of US 62 and is listed on the National Register of Historic Places.

Brightwater got its start circa 1840. A post office called Brightwater was established in 1882, and remained in operation until 1907.

References

Unincorporated communities in Arkansas
1882 establishments in Arkansas